The 1998 du Maurier Open women's doubles was the women's doubles event of the one hundred and ninth edition of the Canadian Open; a WTA Tier I tournament and the most prestigious women's tennis tournament held in Canada. Yayuk Basuki and Caroline Vis were the defending champions but lost in the final 6–3, 6–4 against Martina Hingis and Jana Novotná.

Seeds
Champion seeds are indicated in bold text while text in italics indicates the round in which those seeds were eliminated. The top four seeded teams received byes into the second round.

Draw

Final

Top half

Bottom half

External links
 1998 du Maurier Open Women's doubles draw

Doubles
1998 du Maurier Open